A proton is a stable subatomic particle, symbol , H+, or 1H+ with a positive electric charge of +1 e (elementary charge). Its mass is slightly less than that of a neutron and 1,836 times the mass of an electron (the proton–electron mass ratio). Protons and neutrons, each with masses of approximately one atomic mass unit, are jointly referred to as "nucleons" (particles present in atomic nuclei).

One or more protons are present in the nucleus of every atom. They provide the attractive electrostatic central force that binds the atomic electrons. The number of protons in the nucleus is the defining property of an element, and is referred to as the atomic number (represented by the symbol Z). Since each element has a unique number of protons, each element has its own unique atomic number, which determines the number of atomic electrons and consequently the chemical characteristics of the element.

The word proton is Greek for "first", and this name was given to the hydrogen nucleus by Ernest Rutherford in 1920. In previous years, Rutherford had discovered that the hydrogen nucleus (known to be the lightest nucleus) could be extracted from the nuclei of nitrogen by atomic collisions. Protons were therefore a candidate to be a fundamental or elementary particle, and hence a building block of nitrogen and all other heavier atomic nuclei.

Although protons were originally considered to be elementary particles, in the modern Standard Model of particle physics, protons are now known to be composite particles, containing three valence quarks, and together with neutrons are now classified as hadrons. Protons are composed of two up quarks of charge +e and one down quark of charge −e. The rest masses of quarks contribute only about 1% of a proton's mass. The remainder of a proton's mass is due to quantum chromodynamics binding energy, which includes the kinetic energy of the quarks and the energy of the gluon fields that bind the quarks together.  Because protons are not fundamental particles, they possess a measurable size; the root mean square charge radius of a proton is about 0.84–0.87 fm ( = ). In 2019, two different studies, using different techniques, found this radius to be 0.833 fm, with an uncertainty of ±0.010 fm.

Free protons occur occasionally on Earth: thunderstorms can produce protons with energies of up to several tens of MeV. At sufficiently low temperatures and kinetic energies, free protons will bind to electrons. However, the character of such bound protons does not change, and they remain protons. A fast proton moving through matter will slow by interactions with electrons and nuclei, until it is captured by the electron cloud of an atom. The result is a protonated atom, which is a chemical compound of hydrogen. In a vacuum, when free electrons are present, a sufficiently slow proton may pick up a single free electron, becoming a neutral hydrogen atom, which is chemically a free radical. Such "free hydrogen atoms" tend to react chemically with many other types of atoms at sufficiently low energies. When free hydrogen atoms react with each other, they form neutral hydrogen molecules (H2), which are the most common molecular component of molecular clouds in interstellar space.

Free protons are routinely used for accelerators for proton therapy or various particle physics experiments, with the most powerful example being the Large Hadron Collider.

Description 

Protons are spin- fermions and are composed of three valence quarks, making them baryons (a sub-type of hadrons). The two up quarks and one down quark of a proton are held together by the strong force, mediated by gluons. A modern perspective has a proton composed of the valence quarks (up, up, down), the gluons, and transitory pairs of sea quarks. Protons have a positive charge distribution, which decays approximately exponentially, with a root mean square charge radius of about 0.8 fm.

Protons and neutrons are both nucleons, which may be bound together by the nuclear force to form atomic nuclei. The nucleus of the most common isotope of the hydrogen atom (with the chemical symbol "H") is a lone proton. The nuclei of the heavy hydrogen isotopes deuterium and tritium contain one proton bound to one and two neutrons, respectively. All other types of atomic nuclei are composed of two or more protons and various numbers of neutrons.

History 
The concept of a hydrogen-like particle as a constituent of other atoms was developed over a long period. As early as 1815, William Prout proposed that all atoms are composed of hydrogen atoms (which he called "protyles"), based on a simplistic interpretation of early values of atomic weights (see Prout's hypothesis), which was disproved when more accurate values were measured.

In 1886, Eugen Goldstein discovered canal rays (also known as anode rays) and showed that they were positively charged particles (ions) produced from gases. However, since particles from different gases had different values of charge-to-mass ratio (q/m), they could not be identified with a single particle, unlike the negative electrons discovered by J. J. Thomson. Wilhelm Wien in 1898 identified the hydrogen ion as the particle with the highest charge-to-mass ratio in ionized gases.

Following the discovery of the atomic nucleus by Ernest Rutherford in 1911, Antonius van den Broek proposed that the place of each element in the periodic table (its atomic number) is equal to its nuclear charge. This was confirmed experimentally by Henry Moseley in 1913 using X-ray spectra.

In 1917 (in experiments reported in 1919 and 1925), Rutherford proved that the hydrogen nucleus is present in other nuclei, a result usually described as the discovery of protons. These experiments began after Rutherford had noticed that, when alpha particles were shot into air (mostly nitrogen), his scintillation detectors showed the signatures of typical hydrogen nuclei as a product. After experimentation Rutherford traced the reaction to the nitrogen in air and found that when alpha particles were introduced into pure nitrogen gas, the effect was larger. In 1919 Rutherford assumed that the alpha particle merely knocked a proton out of nitrogen, turning it into carbon. After observing Blackett's cloud chamber images in 1925, Rutherford realized that the alpha particle was absorbed. After capture of the alpha particle, a hydrogen nucleus is ejected, so that heavy oxygen, not carbon, is the result – i.e., the atomic number Z of the nucleus is increased rather than reduced. This was the first reported nuclear reaction, . Rutherford at first thought of our modern "p" in this equation as a hydrogen ion, .

Depending on one's perspective, either 1919 (when it was seen experimentally as derived from another source than hydrogen) or 1920 (when it was recognized and proposed as an elementary particle) may be regarded as the moment when the proton was 'discovered'.

Rutherford knew hydrogen to be the simplest and lightest element and was influenced by Prout's hypothesis that hydrogen was the building block of all elements. Discovery that the hydrogen nucleus is present in other nuclei as an elementary particle led Rutherford to give the hydrogen nucleus  a special name as a particle, since he suspected that hydrogen, the lightest element, contained only one of these particles. He named this new fundamental building block of the nucleus the proton, after the neuter singular of the Greek word for "first", . However, Rutherford also had in mind the word protyle as used by Prout. Rutherford spoke at the British Association for the Advancement of Science at its Cardiff meeting beginning 24 August 1920. At the meeting, he was asked by Oliver Lodge for a new name for the positive hydrogen nucleus to avoid confusion with the neutral hydrogen atom. He initially suggested both proton and prouton (after Prout). Rutherford later reported that the meeting had accepted his suggestion that the hydrogen nucleus be named the "proton", following Prout's word "protyle". The first use of the word "proton" in the scientific literature appeared in 1920.

Stability 

The free proton (a proton not bound to nucleons or electrons) is a stable particle that has not been observed to break down spontaneously to other particles. Free protons are found naturally in a number of situations in which energies or temperatures are high enough to separate them from electrons, for which they have some affinity. Free protons exist in plasmas in which temperatures are too high to allow them to combine with electrons. Free protons of high energy and velocity make up 90% of cosmic rays, which propagate in vacuum for interstellar distances. Free protons are emitted directly from atomic nuclei in some rare types of radioactive decay. Protons also result (along with electrons and antineutrinos) from the radioactive decay of free neutrons, which are unstable.

The spontaneous decay of free protons has never been observed, and protons are therefore considered stable particles according to the Standard Model. However, some grand unified theories (GUTs) of particle physics predict that proton decay should take place with lifetimes between 1031 to 1036 years and experimental searches have established lower bounds on the mean lifetime of a proton for various assumed decay products.

Another experiment at the Sudbury Neutrino Observatory in Canada searched for gamma rays resulting from residual nuclei resulting from the decay of a proton from oxygen-16.

However, protons are known to transform into neutrons through the process of electron capture (also called inverse beta decay). For free protons, this process does not occur spontaneously but only when energy is supplied. The equation is:

 +  →  + 

The process is reversible; neutrons can convert back to protons through beta decay, a common form of radioactive decay. In fact, a free neutron decays this way, with a mean lifetime of about 15 minutes. A proton can also transform into neutrons through beta plus decay (β+ decay).

According to quantum field theory, the mean proper lifetime of protons  becomes finite when they are accelerating with proper acceleration , and  decreases with increasing . Acceleration gives rise to a non-vanishing probability for the transition . This was a matter of concern in the later 1990s because  is a scalar that can be measured by the inertial and coaccelerated observers. In the inertial frame, the accelerating proton should decay according to the formula above. However, according to the coaccelerated observer the proton is at rest and hence should not decay. This puzzle is solved by realizing that in the coaccelerated frame there is a thermal bath due to Fulling–Davies–Unruh effect, an intrinsic effect of quantum field theory. In this thermal bath, experienced by the proton, there are electrons and antineutrinos with which the proton may interact according to the processes: (i) , (ii)  and (iii) . Adding the contributions of each of these processes, one should obtain .

Quarks and the mass of a proton 
In quantum chromodynamics, the modern theory of the nuclear force, most of the mass of protons and neutrons is explained by special relativity. The mass of a proton is about 80–100 times greater than the sum of the rest masses of its three valence quarks, while the gluons have zero rest mass. The extra energy of the quarks and gluons in a proton, as compared to the rest energy of the quarks alone in the QCD vacuum, accounts for almost 99% of the proton's mass. The rest mass of a proton is, thus, the invariant mass of the system of moving quarks and gluons that make up the particle, and, in such systems, even the energy of massless particles confined to a system is still measured as part of the rest mass of the system.

Two terms are used in referring to the mass of the quarks that make up protons: current quark mass refers to the mass of a quark by itself, while constituent quark mass refers to the current quark mass plus the mass of the gluon particle field surrounding the quark.  These masses typically have very different values. The kinetic energy of the quarks that is a consequence of confinement is a contribution (see Mass in special relativity).  Using lattice QCD calculations, the contributions to the mass of the proton are the quark condensate (~9%, comprising the up and down quarks and a sea of virtual strange quarks), the quark kinetic energy (~32%), the gluon kinetic energy (~37%), and the anomalous gluonic contribution (~23%, comprising contributions from condensates of all quark flavors).

The constituent quark model wavefunction for the proton is

The internal dynamics of protons are complicated, because they are determined by the quarks' exchanging gluons, and interacting with various vacuum condensates. Lattice QCD provides a way of calculating the mass of a proton directly from the theory to any accuracy, in principle. The most recent calculations claim that the mass is determined to better than 4% accuracy, even to 1% accuracy (see Figure S5 in Dürr et al.). These claims are still controversial, because the calculations cannot yet be done with quarks as light as they are in the real world. This means that the predictions are found by a process of extrapolation, which can introduce systematic errors. It is hard to tell whether these errors are controlled properly, because the quantities that are compared to experiment are the masses of the hadrons, which are known in advance.

These recent calculations are performed by massive supercomputers, and, as noted by Boffi and Pasquini: "a detailed description of the nucleon structure is still missing because ... long-distance behavior requires a nonperturbative and/or numerical treatment ..."
More conceptual approaches to the structure of protons are: the topological soliton approach originally due to Tony Skyrme and the more accurate AdS/QCD approach that extends it to include a string theory of gluons, various QCD-inspired models like the bag model and the constituent quark model, which were popular in the 1980s, and the SVZ sum rules, which allow for rough approximate mass calculations. These methods do not have the same accuracy as the more brute-force lattice QCD methods, at least not yet.

Charge radius 

The problem of defining a radius for an atomic nucleus (proton) is similar to the problem of atomic radius, in that neither atoms nor their nuclei have definite boundaries. However, the nucleus can be modeled as a sphere of positive charge for the interpretation of electron scattering experiments: because there is no definite boundary to the nucleus, the electrons "see" a range of cross-sections, for which a mean can be taken. The qualification of "rms" (for "root mean square") arises because it is the nuclear cross-section, proportional to the square of the radius, which is determining for electron scattering.

This value is based on measurements involving a proton and an electron (namely, electron scattering measurements and complex calculation involving scattering cross section based on Rosenbluth equation for momentum-transfer cross section), and studies of the atomic energy levels of hydrogen and deuterium.

However, in 2010 an international research team published a proton charge radius measurement via the Lamb shift in muonic hydrogen (an exotic atom made of a proton and a negatively charged muon). As a muon is 200 times heavier than an electron, its de Broglie wavelength is correspondingly shorter.  This smaller atomic orbital is much more sensitive to the proton's charge radius, so allows more precise measurement.  Their measurement of the root-mean-square charge radius of a proton is ", which differs by 5.0 standard deviations from the CODATA value of ". In January 2013, an updated value for the charge radius of a proton——was published. The precision was improved by 1.7 times, increasing the significance of the discrepancy to 7σ.

If no errors were found in the measurements or calculations, it would have been necessary to re-examine the world's most precise and best-tested fundamental theory: quantum electrodynamics. The proton radius was a puzzle as of 2017.

A resolution came in 2019, when two different studies, using different techniques involving the Lamb shift of the electron in hydrogen, and electron–proton scattering, found the radius of the proton to be 0.833 fm, with an uncertainty of ±0.010 fm, and 0.831 fm.

The radius of the proton is linked to the form factor and momentum-transfer cross section. The atomic form factor G modifies the cross section corresponding to point-like proton.

The atomic form factor is related to the wave function density of the target:

The form factor can be split in electric and magnetic form factors. These can be further written as linear combinations of Dirac and Pauli form factors.

Pressure inside the proton 
Since the proton is composed of quarks confined by gluons, an equivalent pressure that acts on the quarks can be defined. This allows calculation of their distribution as a function of distance from the centre using Compton scattering of high-energy electrons (DVCS, for deeply virtual Compton scattering). The pressure is maximum at the centre, about 1035 Pa, which is greater than the pressure inside a neutron star. It is positive (repulsive) to a radial distance of about 0.6 fm, negative (attractive) at greater distances, and very weak beyond about 2 fm.

Charge radius in solvated proton, hydronium 
The radius of the hydrated proton appears in the Born equation for calculating the hydration enthalpy of hydronium.

Interaction of free protons with ordinary matter 
Although protons have affinity for oppositely charged electrons, this is a relatively low-energy interaction and so free protons must lose sufficient velocity (and kinetic energy) in order to become closely associated and bound to electrons. High energy protons, in traversing ordinary matter, lose energy by collisions with atomic nuclei, and by ionization of atoms (removing electrons) until they are slowed sufficiently to be captured by the electron cloud in a normal atom.

However, in such an association with an electron, the character of the bound proton is not changed, and it remains a proton. The attraction of low-energy free protons to any electrons present in normal matter (such as the electrons in normal atoms) causes free protons to stop and to form a new chemical bond with an atom. Such a bond happens at any sufficiently "cold" temperature (that is, comparable to temperatures at the surface of the Sun) and with any type of atom. Thus, in interaction with any type of normal (non-plasma) matter, low-velocity free protons do not remain free but are attracted to electrons in any atom or molecule with which they come into contact, causing the proton and molecule to combine. Such molecules are then said to be "protonated", and chemically they are simply compounds of hydrogen, often positively charged. Often, as a result, they become so-called Brønsted acids. For example, a proton captured by a water molecule in water becomes hydronium, the aqueous cation .

Proton in chemistry

Atomic number 
In chemistry, the number of protons in the nucleus of an atom is known as the atomic number, which determines the chemical element to which the atom belongs. For example, the atomic number of chlorine is 17; this means that each chlorine atom has 17 protons and that all atoms with 17 protons are chlorine atoms. The chemical properties of each atom are determined by the number of (negatively charged) electrons, which for neutral atoms is equal to the number of (positive) protons so that the total charge is zero. For example, a neutral chlorine atom has 17 protons and 17 electrons, whereas a Cl− anion has 17 protons and 18 electrons for a total charge of −1.

All atoms of a given element are not necessarily identical, however. The number of neutrons may vary to form different isotopes, and energy levels may differ, resulting in different nuclear isomers.

Hydrogen ion 

In chemistry, the term proton refers to the hydrogen ion, . Since the atomic number of hydrogen is 1, a hydrogen ion has no electrons and corresponds to a bare nucleus, consisting of a proton (and 0 neutrons for the most abundant isotope protium ). The proton is a "bare charge" with only about 1/64,000 of the radius of a hydrogen atom, and so is extremely reactive chemically. The free proton, thus, has an extremely short lifetime in chemical systems such as liquids and it reacts immediately with the electron cloud of any available molecule. In aqueous solution, it forms the hydronium ion, H3O+, which in turn is further solvated by water molecules in clusters such as [H5O2]+ and [H9O4]+.

The acid is referred to as a proton donor and the base as a proton acceptor. Likewise, biochemical terms such as proton pump and proton channel refer to the movement of hydrated  ions.

The ion produced by removing the electron from a deuterium atom is known as a deuteron, not a proton. Likewise, removing an electron from a tritium atom produces a triton.

Proton nuclear magnetic resonance (NMR) 
Also in chemistry, the term "proton NMR" refers to the observation of hydrogen-1 nuclei in (mostly organic) molecules by nuclear magnetic resonance. This method uses the quantized spin magnetic moment of the proton, which is due to its angular momentum (or spin), which in turn has a magnitude of one-half the reduced Planck constant.. The name refers to examination of protons as they occur in protium (hydrogen-1 atoms) in compounds, and does not imply that free protons exist in the compound being studied.

Human exposure 

The Apollo Lunar Surface Experiments Packages (ALSEP) determined that more than 95% of the particles in the solar wind are electrons and protons, in approximately equal numbers.

Protons also have extrasolar origin from galactic cosmic rays, where they make up about 90% of the total particle flux. These protons often have higher energy than solar wind protons, and their intensity is far more uniform and less variable than protons coming from the Sun, the production of which is heavily affected by solar proton events such as coronal mass ejections.

Research has been performed on the dose-rate effects of protons, as typically found in space travel, on human health. To be more specific, there are hopes to identify what specific chromosomes are damaged, and to define the damage, during cancer development from proton exposure. Another study looks into determining "the effects of exposure to proton irradiation on neurochemical and behavioral endpoints, including dopaminergic functioning, amphetamine-induced conditioned taste aversion learning, and spatial learning and memory as measured by the Morris water maze. Electrical charging of a spacecraft due to interplanetary proton bombardment has also been proposed for study. There are many more studies that pertain to space travel, including galactic cosmic rays and their possible health effects, and solar proton event exposure.

The American Biostack and Soviet Biorack space travel experiments have demonstrated the severity of molecular damage induced by heavy ions on microorganisms including Artemia cysts.

Antiproton 

CPT-symmetry puts strong constraints on the relative properties of particles and antiparticles and, therefore, is open to stringent tests. For example, the charges of a proton and antiproton must sum to exactly zero. The magnetic moment of antiprotons has been measured with an error of  nuclear Bohr magnetons, and is found to be equal and opposite to that of a proton.

See also 

 Fermion field
 Hydrogen
 Hydron (chemistry)
 List of particles
 Proton–proton chain
 Quark model
 Proton spin crisis
 Proton therapy

References

Further reading

External links 
 
 Particle Data Group at LBL
 Large Hadron Collider
 
Inside the Proton, the ‘Most Complicated Thing You Could Possibly Imagine’, Quanta Magazine, Oct 19 2022

 
Baryons
Cations
Nucleons
Hydrogen physics
1910s in science